The Kunmadaras pogrom was an anti-Semitic pogrom that took place shortly after the Second World War in Kunmadaras, Hungary. 

The pogrom took place on 22 May 1946. According to the Jewish Telegraphic Agency, four Jews were killed.

The riot began in the marketplace as a spontaneous protest against a suspected profiteer. Since the traditional occupation of the Jews in the area was trade, the image of a profiteer was conflated with that of a Jew. Thus the riot grew into an anti-Jewish pogrom. The frenzy was further instigated by the rumors that the Jews were stealing Christian children. The historian Péter Apor made a peculiar observation about the subsequent trial of the pogromists: "The People's Tribunal managed to produce a narrative of an anti-Semitic pogrom without involving the Jewish victims." The pogrom was portrayed as a resurgence of fascism pitched against the nascent people's democracy.

Nine rioters were convicted on 26  July 1946 of having instigated and participated in the violence, with sentences ranging from the death penalty for three of those convicted, to six years imprisonment.

See also
Anti-Jewish violence in Eastern Europe, 1944–1946

References

Further reading
 

Anti-Jewish violence in Central and Eastern Europe, 1944–1946
Blood libel
Antisemitism in Hungary
Jewish Hungarian history
Massacres in Hungary
May 1946 events in Europe
1946 riots
1946 murders in Hungary
1946 in Judaism